The Federal Reserve Bank of Chicago (informally the Chicago Fed) is one of twelve regional Reserve Banks that, along with the Federal Reserve Board of Governors, make up the United States' central bank.
The Chicago Reserve Bank serves the Seventh Federal Reserve District, which encompasses the northern portions of Illinois and Indiana, southern Wisconsin, the Lower Peninsula of Michigan, and the state of Iowa.
In addition to participation in the formulation of monetary policy, each Reserve Bank supervises member banks and bank holding companies, provides financial services to depository institutions and the U.S. government, and monitors economic conditions in its District.

Responsibilities 

As one of the Reserve Banks that make up the Federal Reserve System, the Chicago Fed is responsible for:
 Helping to formulate national monetary policy. The Chicago Fed's CEO, Charles L. Evans, helps formulate monetary policy by taking part and voting in meetings of the Federal Open Market Committee (FOMC).
 Providing financial services such as cash, check clearing and electronic payment processing. Each day the Federal Reserve System processes millions of payments in the form of both paper checks and electronic transfers. These payments services are offered to institutions in the Seventh District on a fee basis. Because of a nationwide reduction in the use of checking instruments, the Chicago Fed and most other Reserve Banks ceased processing paper checks on November 17, 2009 and electronic checks in 2010.  Items previously routed to this facility are now routed to the Federal Reserve Bank of Cleveland or to the Federal Reserve Bank of Atlanta. 
 Supervising and regulating state-chartered banks that are members of the Federal Reserve System, bank holding companies, and financial holding companies. These organizations are located within the Seventh Federal Reserve District.

Leadership 
Austan Goolsbee is the current president of the Chicago Fed. He took office on January 9, 2023 as the tenth president and chief executive officer of the Federal Reserve Bank of Chicago.

Ellen Bromagen is first vice president and chief operating officer of the Chicago Fed.

Anna Paulson is Executive Vice President and Director of Research. 

The Chicago Fed annually co-hosts in Chicago an international banking conference to examine cross-national banking and finance issues.

Money Museum 

The bank's Money Museum is free and open to the public year-round from 8:30am to 5pm, Monday through Friday, except on Bank holidays. All visitors must show a photo identification, walk through a metal detector and have their bags x-rayed before entering the Money Museum. No food or drink are allowed in the museum.
A presentation lasting roughly 45 minutes is available at 1pm on Monday through Friday, or by appointment. The rest of the Money Museum is accessible at any time during open hours.
The museum includes a free kiosk, which takes a guest's picture in front of a million dollars in $100 bills.  A million dollars in $1 bills and a million dollars in $20 bills are on display. The museum has been known for giving out bags of shredded money as souvenirs.

Branch 
The Federal Reserve Bank of Chicago has a branch office in Detroit.

Board of directors

The following people are on the board of directors . Class A directors are elected by member banks to represent member banks. Class B directors are elected by member banks to represent the public. Class C directors are appointed by the board of governors to represent the public.

See also

 Federal Reserve Act
 Federal Reserve System
 Federal Reserve Districts
 Federal Reserve Branches
 Federal Reserve Bank of Chicago Detroit Branch
 Structure of the Federal Reserve System

References

External links 
 Federal Reserve Bank of Chicago
 Historical resources by and about the Federal Reserve Bank of Chicago, available on FRASER

Office buildings in Chicago
Chicago
Tourist attractions in Chicago
Economy of the Midwestern United States